The Albany and Eastern Railroad  is a short line railroad in the Willamette Valley of Oregon that was created when the BNSF Railway spun off its Sweet Home Branch Line in May 1998. The main line runs from Albany to Lebanon, with two branch lines at Lebanon going to Sweet Home and Mill City. At the Albany end of the main line it connects to Union Pacific and BNSF lines.

History
The  of the Albany-Lebanon mainline were built by the newly founded Albany and Lebanon Railroad in 1880. The A&L was shortly thereafter bought by the Oregon and California Railroad, which ran from Portland to the Oregon-California border. In turn, the O&C was bought by Southern Pacific in 1887. The Albany-Lebanon line became one of several branches off the main route from San Francisco to Portland, which went through Albany. New branches were also constructed as the Willamette Valley industrialized, including a  route northeast from Lebanon to the booming lumber town of Mill City built in 1910. SP leased both branch lines to the Willamette Valley Railway in 1993, and sold them outright to WVR in 1996 shortly before its acquisition by Union Pacific. 

The  Lebanon-Sweet Home branch was built by the Spokane, Portland, and Seattle Railway in 1930 as a spur of their passenger Oregon Electric Railway, and eventually acquired by BNSF. The railroad spun it off into the Albany and Eastern in May 1998. 

Five years later, in 2003, AERC bought the Albany-Lebanon and Lebanon-Mill City lines from WVR, completing the current network. In 2007 a revamping of its aging infrastructure began, with new rails, ties, and rebuilt crossings. By 2011 all three lines had been refurbished.

Fleet
As of 2022, the AERC roster consisted of the following:

References

External links
 Official website

Albany, Oregon
Oregon railroads
Spin-offs of the BNSF Railway
1998 establishments in Oregon
Railway companies established in 1998